La Dulce Enemiga (The Sweet Enemy) is a 1957 Mexican drama film, directed by Tito Davison. The film received four nominations and won two Ariel Awards in 1958, for Best Director for Davison and Best Actress for Silvia Pinal. The screenplay is adapted by Tulio Demicheli, Ulyses Petit de Murat and Davison from the novel L´ennemie by André-Paul Antoine.

Main cast
Silvia Pinal as Lucrecia
Joaquín Cordero as Nicolás
Carlos Riquelme as Antonio
Mary López as Catalina
Miguel Manzano as Doctor Hugo Bellini
Consuelo Monteagudo as Anita, secretary
Nicolás Rodríguez as Federico, butler
Armando Arriola as Lucrecia's dad
Alberto de Mendoza as Ricardo

Awards

Ariel Awards
The Ariel Awards are awarded annually by the Mexican Academy of Film Arts and Sciences in Mexico. La Dulce Enemiga received two awards out of four nominations.

|-
|rowspan="4" scope="row"| 1958
|scope="row"| Tito Davison
|rowspan="1" scope="row"| Best Director
| 
|-
|scope="row"| Silvia Pinal
|rowspan="1" scope="row"| Best Actress
| 
|-
|scope="row"| Carlos Riquelme
|rowspan="1" scope="row"| Best Supporting Actor
| 
|-
|scope="row"| Tulio Demicheli
|rowspan="1" scope="row"| Best Adapted Screenplay
| 
|-
|-

External links

References

1957 films
1957 drama films
Mexican drama films
1950s Spanish-language films
Films with screenplays by Tulio Demicheli
1950s Mexican films